Scenes from a Gay Marriage is a 2012 romantic comedy film written and directed by Matt Riddlehoover. It was shot in Nashville, Tennessee.

The film was successful enough that a sequel, More Scenes from a Gay Marriage (2014), was produced.

Cast

 Matt Riddlehoover as Darren
 Carson Nicely as Neighbor
 Cliff Burr as Greg
 Thashana McQuiston as Luce
 Jared Allman as Joe
 Malachi Taylor as Neighbor's Boyfriend
 Devin Walls as Leigh Peters
 Domiziano Arcangeli as Aldo
 Nathan McKellips as Neighbor's Ex
 J.R. Robles as Walt DePore

References

External links 
 

2012 films
2012 LGBT-related films
LGBT-related romantic comedy films
American LGBT-related films
American romantic comedy films
2012 romantic comedy films
2010s English-language films
2010s American films